Thomas E. Askew (c. 1847 – July 12, 1914) was a photographer in Atlanta, Georgia. An African American, his work included portraits of himself, his family, and prominent African American community members.

His portraits and views were included in an album titled Types of American Negroes that was compiled by W. E. B. Du Bois for The Exhibit of American Negroes at the Exposition Universelle of 1900 in Paris.

He died on July 12, 1914. The Great Atlanta Fire of 1917 destroyed his studio and equipment. He is buried in Atlanta's Oakland Cemetery.

References

Further reading 

1840s births
1914 deaths
African-American photographers
Photographers from Georgia (U.S. state)
Year of birth uncertain
20th-century African-American people